Bočkovo is a small settlement north of Velike Bloke in the Municipality of Bloke in the Inner Carniola region of Slovenia.

References

External links 
Bočkovo on Geopedia

Populated places in the Municipality of Bloke